KNEF (90.1 FM) is a radio station licensed to Franklin, Nebraska, US.  The station is currently owned by South Central Oklahoma Christian Broadcasting, Inc.

KNEF broadcasts a southern gospel format to the Franklin, Nebraska, area.

History
This station was assigned call sign KNEF on February 6, 2009.

References

External links
thegospelstation.com

NEF
Southern Gospel radio stations in the United States
Radio stations established in 2009